Events in the year 1801 in Art.

Events

Works

Fyodor Alekseyev – Red Square in Moscow
Jean Broc – The Death of Hyacinthos
Jacques-Louis David – Napoleon Crossing the Alps (first version)
John Flaxman – Marble memorial to William Jones in chapel of University College, Oxford
François Gérard – Portrait of Empress Josephine
Anne-Louis Girodet de Roussy-Trioson – Ossian receiving the Ghosts of the French Heroes (Apothéose des héros français morts pour la patrie pendant la guerre de la liberté) (approx. date)
Francisco Goya
Charles IV of Spain and His Family
Portrait of Manuel Godoy
Philip James de Loutherbourg – Coalbrookdale by Night
Rembrandt Peale – Rubens Peale with a Geranium
J. M. W. Turner – Dutch Boats in a Gale (the Bridgewater Sea Piece)
Marie-Denise Villers – Young Woman Drawing
Richard Westmacott – Marble memorial to John Yorke in parish church of St. Andrew, Wimpole, England

Births
January 4 – James Giles, Scottish landscape painter (died 1870)
January 26 – John Quidor, American painter (died 1881)
February 1 – Thomas Cole, American painter (died 1848)
April 14 – Fedor Solntsev, Russian painter and art historian (died 1892)
April 30 – André Giroux, French painter and photographer (died 1879)
July 26 – Maria Röhl, Swedish painter (died 1875)
September 4 – Alfred d'Orsay, French painter, sculptor and patron of the arts (died 1852)
date unknown
Dai Xi, Chinese painter of the 19th century and representative of the academic manner (died 1860)
Fei Danxu, Chinese painter in Qing Dynasty (died 1850)
Robert Richard Scanlan, Irish painter and portraitist (died 1876)
Alexey Tyranov, Russian painter (died 1859)
probable (born 1801/1804) – Paul Gavarni, French caricaturist (died 1866)

Deaths
January 30 - Giuseppe Ceracchi, Italian sculptor (born 1751)
February 7 – Daniel Chodowiecki, Polish-born painter (born 1726)
March 3 – Michael Angelo Rooker, English oil and watercolour painter, illustrator and engraver (born 1746)
April 7 – Jacobus Buys, Dutch painter and engraver (born 1724)
May 29 – Jan Bulthuis, Dutch draftsman and painter (born 1750)
June 28
 Martin Johann Schmidt, Austrian Rococo painter (born 1718)
 Francis Wheatley, English portrait and landscape painter (born 1747)
June 30 – Giuseppe Ceracchi, Italian-born portrait sculpture and republican, guillotined in France (born 1751)
August 16 – Ralph Earl, American historical and portrait painter (born 1751)
September 6 - William Tyler, English sculptor and architect, co-founder of the Royal Academy of Arts (born 1728)
October 11 – John Donaldson, Scottish-born miniature painter in enamel and watercolour (born 1737)
November 14 – Sigmund Freudenberger, Swiss painter (born 1745)
December 2 – William Hamilton, English historical and decorative painter (born 1751)
 date unknown
Filippo Pennino, Italian sculptor (born 1755)

References

 
Years of the 19th century in art
1800s in art